McMullen is a surname with predominantly Irish origins but also with some Scottish history. It derives from root forenames such as: Maolain, Maelan "Hillock" and Meallain "Pleasant". All of these forenames have over time evolved to the collateral "Son of Maolain", anglicised McMullen.

Notable people with the surname include:

 Catherine Cookson (1906–1998), English author who published in the United States under her maiden name Catherine McMullen
 Curtis T. McMullen (born 1958), American mathematician
 James McMullen, (1833–1913), Canadian politician 
 John McMullen (1832–1883), Irish-born, American Roman Catholic bishop
 Mal McMullen (1927–1995), American professional basketball player
 Michael McMullen, South Australian architect, designer of Marryatville, South Australia#The Acacias and many other notable buildings in Adelaide
 Nathan McMullen (born 1988), English stage and TV actor
 Peter McMullen (born 1942), British mathematician
 Phil McMullen (born 1958), music critic from England, founder of both Ptolemaic Terrascope magazine and the Terrastock festivals
 Ramsey MacMullen (1928-2022), American historian and writer
 Richard C. McMullen (1849–1926), American manufacturer and politician, Governor of Delaware
 Sean McMullen (born 1948), Australian science fiction writer 
 Scott McMullen (born 1980), American football player
 Eugene McMullen (born 1958) Grew largest pumpkin in State of Illinois 2150 pounds, at time of weigh in the largest pumpkin ever grown in North America

See also
McMullens, British regional brewery in Hertford, England
McMullen Bros Ltd, Irish distributors of Maxol and Calor Gas fuel products 
Mac Maoláin, an Irish Gaelic surname

Anglicised Irish-language surnames